Jesse Jams is a Canadian short documentary film, directed by Trevor Anderson and released in 2020. The film is a portrait of Jesse Jams, a transgender First Nations musician from Edmonton, Alberta who formed the punk rock band Jesse Jams and the Flams as a tool of healing from his history of trauma and mental illness.

The film premiered in March 2020 at Outfest Fusion. Concurrently with the release of the film, Jesse Jams and the Flams released You Don't Know Crazy, an EP of some of the songs heard in the film.

The film received a Canadian Screen Award nomination for Best Short Documentary at the 9th Canadian Screen Awards in 2021.

References

External links
 

2020 films
2020 short documentary films
2020 LGBT-related films
Canadian LGBT-related short films
Canadian short documentary films
Documentary films about First Nations
Transgender-related documentary films
Documentary films about punk music and musicians
2020s English-language films
2020s Canadian films
Films directed by Trevor Anderson